A number of vessels of the People’s Liberation Army Navy have borne the name Yinchuan, after the capital Yinchuan.

 , in service 1971–2007. Now a Museum ship in Yinchuan.
 , a Type 052D destroyer, in service since 2016.

References 

People's Liberation Army Navy ship names